The following lists events that happened during 1929 in Chile.

Incumbents
President of Chile: Carlos Ibáñez del Campo

Events

June
3 June – Treaty of Lima (1929)

Births 
17 Feb – Alejandro Jodorowsky
4 May – Manuel Contreras (d. 2015)
22 June – José Florencio Guzmán (d. 2017)
26 June – Jorge Jottar (d. 2014)
25 July – Guillermo Solá (d. 2020)
10 August – Nicolás Díaz (d. 2019)
26 October – Orlando Cornejo (d. 2015)

Deaths
30 May – Joaquín Figueroa (b. 1863)
6 October – Ismael Tocornal (b. 1850)

References 

 
Years of the 20th century in Chile
Chile